1977 Australian Labor Party leadership election may refer to:

 May 1977 Australian Labor Party leadership spill
 December 1977 Australian Labor Party leadership election